Aureliano José Lessa (1828–1861) was a Brazilian poet, adept of the "Ultra-Romanticism" movement. Born in Minas Gerais in 1828, he moved to São Paulo in 1847 to study Law, but received his bacharel degree at the Faculdade de Direito de Olinda, in Pernambuco, in 1851. He worked as attorney general in the city of Ouro Preto, and also as a lawyer in the cities of Diamantina and Serro.

During his stay at São Paulo he met the authors Álvares de Azevedo and Bernardo Guimarães. With them, he planned a volume of poetry called As Três Liras (in ), that ended unsuccessful. Along with those and others, he was a member of a club named "Sociedade Epicureia" ("Epicurean Society").

Aureliano only wrote some texts to newspapers of São Paulo and Minas Gerais during his lifetime. His poems were compiled and published posthumously in 1873 by his brother, Francisco José Pedro Lessa, under the name of Poesias Póstumas (in ).

A heavy drinker, Lessa died on February 21, 1861, because of a lesion in his heart, caused by his alcoholism.

Aureliano was the uncle of Pedro Augusto Carneiro Lessa.

External links
 A poem by Aureliano Lessa 
 Aureliano Lessa's profile at the official site of Cravo Albin Dictionary 
 Poems by Lessa 

1828 births
1861 deaths
Brazilian journalists
People from Minas Gerais
Romantic poets
19th-century Brazilian writers
19th-century journalists
Male journalists
19th-century Brazilian poets
Brazilian male poets
19th-century Brazilian male writers